The Women's International League for Peace and Freedom (WILPF) is a non-profit non-governmental organization working "to bring together women of different political views and philosophical and religious backgrounds determined to study and make known the causes of war and work for a permanent peace" and to unite women worldwide who oppose oppression and exploitation. WILPF has national sections in 37 countries.

The WILPF is headquartered in Geneva and maintains a United Nations office in New York City.

Organizational history

WILPF developed out of the International Women's Congress against World War I that took place in The Hague, Netherlands, in 1915 and the formation of the International Women's Committee of Permanent Peace; the name WILPF was not chosen until 1919. The first WILPF president, Jane Addams, had previously founded the Woman's Peace Party in the United States, in January 1915, this group later became the US section of WILPF. Along with Jane Addams, Marian Cripps and Margaret E. Dungan were also founding members. The British Maude Royden remained vice president of the international WILPF. As of 1920 the US section of WILPF was headquartered in New York City. Marian Cripps, Baroness Parmoor, who later served as president of its British branch.<ref name=adam>{{cite web|title=Sir John Lavery Portrait of The Lady Parmooor Oil on canvas, 76 x 64cm (30 x 25) Signed |url=https://www.adams.ie/Sir-John-Lavery-Portrait-of-The-Lady-Parmooor-Oil-on-canvas-76-x-64cm-30-x-25-Signed-The-sitter-is-Marian-Emily-Ellis-A-Quaker-and-world-president-of-the-YWCA-between-1924-and-1928-she-was-also-a-lead?view=lot_detail|access-date=6 January 2013}}</ref> Richard J. Evans described the founders of WILPF as "a tiny band of courageous and principled women on the far-left fringes of bourgeois-liberal feminism".

Furthermore, the Women’s International League for Peace and Freedom is opposed to wars and international conflicts. The major movements of the league have been: open letter to UN secretary general to formally end the Korean War, a statement on weapons and an international day for the total elimination of nuclear weapons, gender-based violence and women human rights defenders.

Woman's Peace Party (USA)

A forerunner to the Women's International League for Peace and Freedom, the Woman's Peace Party (WPP) was formed in January, 1915 in Washington, D.C., at a meeting called by Jane Addams and Carrie Chapman Catt. The approximately 3,000 women attendees approved a platform calling for the extension of suffrage to women and for a conference of neutral countries to offer continuous mediation as a way of ending war.

WPP sent representatives, among them the hounralist and novelist Mary Heaton Vorse, to a subsequent International Women's Congress for Peace and Freedom, held in The Hague from April 28–30, 1915.

International Congress of Women, The Hague, 1915
The 1915 International Congress of Women was organized by the German feminist Anita Augspurg, Germany's first female jurist, and Lida Gustava Heymann (1868–1943) at the invitation of the Dutch pacifist, feminist and suffragist Aletta Jacobs to protest the war then raging in Europe, and to suggest ways to prevent war in the future. The Congress opened on April 28, wound up on May 1, and was attended by 1,136 participants from both neutral and belligerent nations. It adopted much of the platform of WPP and established an International Committee of Women for Permanent Peace (ICWPP) with Jane Addams as president. WPP soon became the US Section of ICWPP.

Second International Women's Congress for Peace and Freedom, Zürich, 1919
Jane Addams met with President Woodrow Wilson and is said to have worked out some common ground on peace. However, at their second international congress, held in Zürich in 1919, ICWPP denounced the final terms of the peace treaty ending World War I as a scheme of revenge of the victors over the vanquished that would sow the seeds of another world war. They decided to make their committee permanent and renamed it the Women's International League for Peace and Freedom. WILPF moved its headquarters to Geneva to be near the proposed site of the League of Nations, although WILPF did not endorse empowering that organization to conduct food blockades or to use military pressure to enforce its resolutions. The League called for international disarmament and an end to economic imperialism. The US branch of WILPF grew in recognition and membership during the post-WWI era, despite some attacks on the organisation as "unpatriotic" during the First Red Scare. The WILPF supported treaties such as the Washington Naval Treaty and the Kellogg-Briand Pact, regarding them as stepping stones to a peaceful world order.

During the 1930s, Vera Brittain was the WILPF's Vice-President.

Prior to the outbreak of World War Two, the League also supported measures to provide relief for Europe's Jewish community.

Although WIPLF membership is restricted to women, several male peace activists have contributed to WIPLF meetings and publications, including Bart de Ligt and J. D. Bernal.

Two WILPF leaders have received the Nobel Peace Prize for their peace efforts and international outlook and work with WILPF: Jane Addams, in 1931 and Emily Greene Balch in 1946.

As long term supporters of the Permanent Court of Arbitration, Inter Parliamentary Union, League of Nations, International Labour Organization, International Peace Bureau and United Nations, they remain a flagship organisation in the Peace Movement.

WILPF and the United Nations
WILPF has had Consultative Status (category B) with the UN Economic and Social Council (ECOSOC) since 1948 and has Special Consultative Relations with the United Nations Educational, Scientific and Cultural Organization (UNESCO) and the United Nations Conference on Trade and Development (UNCTAD), as well as special relations with the International Labour Organization (ILO), Food and Agriculture Organization (FAO), United Nations Children's Fund (UNICEF) and other organizations and agencies. WILPF has advocates and lobbies for the democratization of the UN, the Security Council and all other UN organizations and agencies; monitors Security Council and General Assembly activities in order to promote reforms; opposes the privatisation and corporatisation of the UN, especially the global compact with corporations; and advocates for the abolition of the Security Council veto.

WILPF today

Mission and vision
Work areas
Building the movement
Redefining security
Leveraging feminist perspectives on peace
Promoting socio-economic justice

Broad areas of concern are:
Global programs
Human Rights Programme
Women, Peace and Security Programme
Disarmament Programme
Crisis Response Programme

PeaceWomen
The Women in Peace and Security Programme (WIPSEN or "PeaceWomen") was founded in 2000. It monitors the UN's work in field of women, peace and security, taken part in advocacy and outreach. WIPSEN-Africa was founded in 2006 by Liberian activist Leymah Gbowee, Nigerian activist Thelma Ekiyor, and Ecoma Bassey Alaga, and is based in Ghana.

 Notable Members 
WILPF's list of members include Jane Addams, Gertrud Woker, Aletta Jacobs, Alice Walker, Coretta Scott King, Madeleine Rees, Madeleine Zabriskie Doty, Cornelia Ramondt-Hirschmann, Selma Meyer, Brandy G. Robinson, Margaret Hills (née Robertson), Sheyene Gerardi, Shina Inoue Kan, Harriet Connor Brown, Emily Greene Balch, Kathleen Innes, Else Zeuthen, Madeleine Rolland, and Lucy Biddle Lewis.

Congresses and Congress Resolutions
WILPF's international records are held at the University of Colorado Boulder. They contain the reports of the congresses.

See also
 A Single Woman, play
 Anti-war movement
 Danske Kvinders Fredskæde
 Gender and Security Sector Reform
 Jeannette Rankin
 People's Council of America for Democracy and Peace
 Raging Grannies
 List of women pacifists and peace activists
 List of anti-war organizations
 List of peace activists
 List of women's organizations
 Helene Stähelin (mathematician) — President of the WILPF's Swiss section 1948–1967
 Gertrude C. Bussey — President of the WILPF's American section 1939–1941, and Honorary National President 1960–1961 who wrote much of WILPF's history.
 Feminist peace research

Notes

 Further reading 
Harriet Hyman Alonso, Peace as a Women's Issue: A History of the U.S. Movement for World Peace and Women's Rights Syracuse, NY: Syracuse University Press, 1993.
Gertrude Bussey and Margaret Tims, Pioneers for Peace: Women's International League for Peace and Freedom 1915-1965. Oxford: Alden Press, 1980..
Carrie A. Foster, The Women and the Warriors: The U.S. Section of the Women's International League for Peace and Freedom, 1915-1946. Syracuse, NY: Syracuse University Press, 1995.
Catherine Foster, Women for All Seasons: The Story of the Women's International League for Peace and Freedom. Athens, GA: University of Georgia Press, 1989.
Melinda Plastas, A Band of Noble Women: Racial Politics in the Women's Peace Movement. Syracuse, NY: Syracuse University Press, 2011.
Leila J. Rupp: "Transnational Women's Movements," European History Online, Mainz: Institute of European History, 2011.
 Ethel Snowden, A Political Pilgrim in Europe, New York: George H. Doran, 1921.
 Jo Vellacott. "A place for pacifism and transnationalism in feminist theory: the early work of the Women's International League for Peace and Freedom." Women History Review'' 2.1 (1993): 23-56. online

External links

 
WILPF Australia Section official website
Jane Addams Peace Association
Peace Women
Reaching Critical Will
Women's International League for Peace and Freedom, International Headquarters records, University of Colorado at Boulder
Women's International League for Peace and Freedom, American Section records, Collection DG 043, Swarthmore College
 Women's International League for Peace and Freedom, British Section records, London School of Economics, Archives Division
Women's International League for Peace and Freedom selected papers and photos included in Peace and Internationalism Digitised Collection, LSE Digital Library
Records, 1915-1977. Schlesinger Library, Radcliffe Institute, Harvard University
Women's International League for Peace and Freedom Collection (ARS.0056), Stanford Archive of Recorded Sound
Archives of the British section of WILPF

 
Liberal feminist organizations
Organizations established in 1915
1915 establishments in the United States
Opposition to World War I
Peace organizations
International Campaign to Abolish Nuclear Weapons